Hindes is an unincorporated community in Atascosa County, in the U.S. state of Texas. According to the Handbook of Texas, the community had a population of 14 from 1974 through 2000. It is located within the San Antonio metropolitan area.

History
This community was named for local settler George F Hindes, who donated land for the San Antonio, Uvalde, and Gulf Railroad in 1912 as a right of way. It is here that the community was established. The two major crops raised here in the early 1900s were cotton and corn. Hindes had a post office, a bank, a general store, a gin, and two churches in 1913. Hindes reached its population zenith of 100 in 1927 then lost half of it in the 1930s. The number of businesses in the community ranged from one to four. It had three businesses, a factory, and several scattered houses in the 1940s. Its post office closed in 1942. There were no more businesses in Hindes in 1974, but its population was listed as 14 from 1974 through 2000. It had a cluster of houses, especially farmhouses, in 1988.

The transmitter for local radio station KSAH-FM is located in Hindes.

Geography

Education
The first school in Hindes opened in 1912 and had six classrooms. It had 88 students and three teachers in 1934. Today the community is served by the Charlotte Independent School District.

References

Unincorporated communities in Atascosa County, Texas
Unincorporated communities in Texas